Charles Bonner Larose (February 14, 1901 in Ottawa, Ontario — January 23, 1963) was a Canadian ice hockey player who played six games in the National Hockey League with the Boston Bruins during the 1925–26 season. The rest of his career, which lasted from 1917 to 1928, was mainly spent in the Ottawa City Hockey League.

Career statistics

Regular season and playoffs

External links
 

1901 births
1963 deaths
Boston Bruins players
Boston Tigers (CAHL) players
Canadian ice hockey left wingers
Central Hockey League (1925–1926) players
Ice hockey people from Ottawa
Fort Pitt Hornets players
New Haven Eagles players
St. Paul Saints (AHA) players
Canadian expatriate ice hockey players in the United States